Kaneva, LLC is a privately owned American video game company based in Atlanta, Georgia and founded in 2004 by Christopher Klaus and Greg Frame. Kaneva was a 3D Virtual World that supported 2D web browsing, social networking and shared media.

In 2004 Kaneva worked with Georgia's Department of Economic Development to draft a new law that would promote video game development in Georgia. It passed in 2004.

On 14 November 2016, Kaneva's online world was shut down, with its "2d" social networking site closely following.

Background
Kaneva was founded to develop a massively multi-player online game (MMOG). In late 2004, Kaneva released the first version of the Kaneva Game Platform.

Kaneva later decided to use its own technology to develop a virtual world that combined video sharing, social networking and 3D environments. In 2005, Kaneva started development on the Virtual World of Kaneva, the company's flagship product. The Virtual World of Kaneva was released into beta in mid-2006.

A new site was created in April 2006 to allow the community of game developers to collaborate on their Kaneva Game Platform projects. This site was named the Kaneva Elite Developers Site.

The Elite Developers program was discontinued with their source code release in November 2009.  The source code is hidden, but was available to everyone on the resources page on their developer website which is now defunct and no longer available to the public.

In the first quarter of 2010 Kaneva released their Kaneva 3D Applications and their 3D App Game Developer Program which is now Defunct and available to developers Kaneva shifted from featured MMO development to smaller scale 3D application development which closely mirrors the very popular Facebook applications.

In 2016 the original game was shut down. In 2017, the company launched a new game, CasinoLife Poker, for mobile platforms, and as a Facebook App.

Status And Closure
In June 2010, the original Kaneva Platform had over five million members and content creators.

In 2016 Kaneva LLC Announced shut down its original game platform and its social community site.

Competitors Of Original Platform 
The OriginalKaneva Platform had several competitors during its lifetime, including OSgrid.org, Smallworlds, Entropia Universe, Utherverse, IMVU, Active Worlds, vSide, Second Life and Twinity.

Competitors Of The New Platform 
CasinoLife Poker had several competitors offering 3D Virtual Reality Poker, including Casino VR Poker, Poker Show VR and VR Poker. One difference between those games, and CasinoLife Poker, is that it is the first such VR Social Poker to be available to play for free, with monetization coming from micro-transactions within the game instead.

References

External links
 Official website

American companies established in 2004
Video game companies of the United States
Virtual world communities
Companies based in Atlanta
Video game companies established in 2004